Irv is a diminutive form (hypocorism) of the masculine given names Irving, Irvin, Irvine, etc. It may refer to:

 Irvin Irv Anderson (1923–2008), American politician
 Irving Irv Comp (1919–1989), American National Football League player
 Irv Constantine (1907–1966), American National Football League player
 Irving Cottler (1918–1989), American drummer
 Irvin Irv Cross (1939–2021), American sportscaster and former National Football League player
 Irvin Irv Eatman (born 1961), American former National Football League and United States Football League player
 Irvine Irv Frew (1907–1995), Scottish-born Canadian National Hockey League player
 Irving Irv Goode (born 1940), American former National Football League player
 Irv Gotti (born 1970), American hip hop and R&B record producer born Irving Domingo Lorenzo, Jr.
 H. Irving Grousbeck (born 1934), American entrepreneur, Stanford Business School professor and co-owner of the Boston Celtics National Basketball Association franchise
 Irving Irv Kluger (1921–2006), American jazz drummer
 Irving Irv Kupcinet (1912–2003), American newspaper columnist and television talk-show host
Irv Mondschein (1924–2015), American track and field champion
 Irving Irv Noren (1924–2019), American former Major League Baseball player and coach
 Irving Irv Novick (1916–2004), American comic book artist
 Irvin Irv Pankey (born 1958), American former National Football League player
 Irving Irv Ray (1864–1948), American professional baseball player
 Irvine Irv Robbins (1917–2008), Canadian-born American co-founder of the Baskin-Robbins ice cream parlor chain
 Irwin Irv Rothenberg (1921–2009), American basketball player in the Basketball Association of America (now the National Basketball Association)
 Irving Irv Rubin (1945–2002), Canadian-born American chairman of the Jewish Defense League
 Irvin Irv Smith (born 1971), American former National Football League player
 Irvin Irv Smith Jr. (born 1998), American football player
 James Irvin Irv Spencer (1937–1999), American National Hockey League and World Hockey Association player
 Irving Irv Torgoff (1917–1993), American basketball player in the Basketball Association of America (now the National Basketball Association)
 Irvin Irv Williams (1919–2019), African-American jazz saxophonist and composer
 Irvin Irv Wisniewski (1925–2014), American college basketball and golf head coach
 Irving Irv Young (1877–1935), American Major League Baseball pitcher

See also
 Irvin (name)
 Irvine (name)
 Irving (name)

Hypocorisms